Collared lizard may refer to:
Any member of the  North America genus Crotaphytus
Crotaphytidae, the family of collared lizards of which Crotaphytus is a member
Oplurus cuvieri, a species native to Madagascar

Animal common name disambiguation pages